The 2018 IIHF World Championship Final was played at the Royal Arena in Copenhagen, Denmark, on 20 May 2018.

Sweden defeated Switzerland in game-winning shots after the score was tied 2–2 following regulation time and a 20-minute overtime period.

Road to the final

Match

References

External links
Official website

Final
2017
International sports competitions in Copenhagen
2018 in Copenhagen